Jamal Walton (born November 25, 1998) is a Caymanian sprinter specializing in the 400 meters as well as an American football player. He represented his country at the 2017 World Championships reaching the semifinals. In addition, he won the gold medal at the 2017 Pan American U20 Championships with a new Championships record and national record of 44.99.

Born in the United States, he has a dual citizenship with the Cayman Islands where his father comes from.

International competitions

1Did not finish in the semifinals

2Did not start in the final

Personal bests

Outdoor
100 meters – 10.57 (+2.0 m/s, Gainesville 2017)
200 meters – 20.57 (+2.0 m/s, Miramar 2017)
400 meters – 44.99 (Trujillo 2017)

References

External links

1998 births
Living people
Caymanian male sprinters
World Athletics Championships athletes for the Cayman Islands